Depressaria djakonovi is a moth in the family Depressariidae. It was described by Alexandr L. Lvovsky in 1981. It is found in southern Siberia.

References

Moths described in 1981
Depressaria
Moths of Asia